Atonement is a 2007 British romantic World War II film directed by Joe Wright. Christopher Hampton adapted the screenplay from the eponymous novel by Ian McEwan. The film focuses on fictional lovers Cecilia (Keira Knightley) and Robbie (James McAvoy), whose lives are ruined when Cecilia's younger sister, Briony (Saoirse Ronan), falsely accuses Robbie of a serious crime. The film opened the 64th Venice International Film Festival on 29 August 2007 and competed for the Golden Lion. The following month it screened at the Vancouver International Film Festival and the Toronto International Film Festival. Atonement was released in the United Kingdom by Universal Studios on 7 September 2007. It was then released in the United States by Focus Features on 7 December 2007. The film earned over £84 million in its combined total gross at the box office.

Atonement earned many awards and nominations in categories ranging from recognition of the film itself to Hampton's screenplay and the cast's acting performances, particularly those of Keira Knightley, James McAvoy and Saoirse Ronan. The film received seven Academy Award nominations and came away with one award for Best Original Score. The Alliance of Women Film Journalists awarded Atonement two accolades from six nominations, while the American Society of Cinematographers and the Art Directors Guild gave the film one nomination apiece. Atonement gathered fourteen nominations at the 61st British Academy Film Awards, the most of any film that year, but ultimately came away with two awards. Cinematographer Seamus McGarvey received a nomination for his work from the British Society of Cinematographers and costume designer, Jacqueline Durran, earned a nomination from the Costume Designers Guild. Atonement won three accolades out of five nominations at the 13th Empire Awards.

The film also received five nominations from the Evening Standard British Film Awards, including Best Actress nominations for both Knightley and Romola Garai (who played Briony aged 18). McGarvey, Durran and Sarah Greenwood were awarded the Best Technical Achievement accolade. At the 65th Golden Globe Awards, Atonement was named Best Drama Motion Picture, while Dario Marianelli won the Golden Globe Award for Best Original Score. The composer would go on to win five more awards for the score, as well as the Film Music Composition of the Year accolade from the International Film Music Critics Association. Intralink Film garnered two nominations from the Golden Trailer Awards and won the Best Romance Trailer category. Ronan won five awards for her performance including Best Actress in a Supporting Role at the 5th Irish Film & Television Awards and Best Young Actress from the Women Film Critics Circle. Atonement earned eight nominations from the London Film Critics' Circle; McAvoy and Vanessa Redgrave (who portrayed an elderly Briony) won the British Actor of the Year and British Supporting Actress of the Year awards respectively. Knightley won Best International Actress at the 2007 Rembrandt Awards and was given the Choice Movie Drama Actress accolade from the Teen Choice Awards. Hampton earned a total of thirteen nominations for the screenplay.

Awards and nominations

References
General

Specific

External links
 

Lists of accolades by film